Conversations with Eamon Dunphy was an Irish radio programme, on which Eamon Dunphy interviewed various celebrities. It aired on Saturdays on RTÉ Radio 1.

On 7 July 2009, Dunphy announced he would cease presenting his programme, to concentrate on sport.

Format
After news and paper reviews, Eamon Dunphy presented Conversations with Eamon Dunphy on RTÉ Radio 1 from 09:10. The programme was divided into three parts, each separated by a commercial break. Many high-profile guests have appeared on the programme. There is one guest every week. Typically the guest discussed their life and career. They were asked to request three pieces of music during the programme. The programme is pre-recorded.

History

Series 1
Series 1 comprised 38 episodes. Notable guests from series 1 included: Seán Óg Ó hAilpín, Maeve Binchy, Anne Robinson, Gay Byrne, Michael O'Leary and Sebastian Barry.

Series 2
Series 2 comprised 44 episodes and notable guests from series 2 included: Dana Rosemary Scallon, Shane Ross, Martin McGuinness, Samantha Power, Sinéad O'Connor and Declan Ganley.

Series 3
Series 3 comprised 39 episodes and notable guests from series 3 included: Louis Walsh, Sonia O'Sullivan, Mary Coughlan and Neil Jordan.

References

External links
 Official Site

Irish talk radio shows
RTÉ Radio 1 programmes